The 1993–94 FIBA Korać Cup season occurred between September 8, 1993, and March 16, 1994. The final was played between PAOK Bravo and Stefanel Trieste.

Team allocation 
The labels in the parentheses show how each team qualified for the place of its starting round:

 1st, 2nd, 3rd, etc.: League position after Playoffs
 CW: Cup Winner

First round

|}

Second round

|}

* & ** Spartak Lugansk and Gravelines withdrew before the first leg and their rivals received a forfeit (20–0) in both games.

*** Nová huť Ostrava didn't travel to Russia to play the second leg and Stroitel Samara received a forfeit (20–0) in this game.

Automatically qualified to the round of 32
  Recoaro Milano
  Scavolini Pesaro
  PAOK Bravo
  Maccabi Tel Aviv
  Estudiantes Argentaria

Round of 32

|}

Round of 16

Group A

Group B

Group C

Group D

Quarterfinals

|}

Semifinals

|}

Finals

|}

External links
 1993–94 FIBA Korać Cup @ linguasport.com

1993–94
1993–94 in European basketball